"What You Got" is the debut solo single of English singer and former Five member Abs, written by Abs, Richard "Biff" Stannard, and Julian Gallagher. Produced by the latter two, the track is based on Althea & Donna's 1977 song "Uptown Top Ranking", so Errol Thompson, Joe Gibbs, and Althea & Donna are given writing credits. The female vocals on the song are provided by Dawn Joseph, Shernette May, and Sharon Murphy.

"What You Got" was released as the lead single from Abs' debut album, Abstract Theory (2003), and was the first single released by a solo Five member following their split in November 2001. Issued on 19 August 2002, the single reached number four on the UK Singles Chart, entered the top 10 in Ireland and New Zealand, and became a top-40 hit in several other European countries and Australia.

Critical reception
In his weekly chart commentary, British columnist James Masterton praised the "Uptown Top Ranking" sample, calling it a "perfect tribute", but wrote that the song is an example of "throwaway pop". British trade paper Music Week called the song's hook "infectious" and predicted the song would become a summer hit.

Chart performance
On 25 August 2002, "What You Got" debuted at number four on the UK Singles Chart, spending three weeks in the top 10 and 11 weeks in the top 100. At the end of 2002, it was ranked at number 116 on the UK year-end chart. In neighbouring Ireland, the song debuted at number 11 on 22 August 2002 and later rose to number nine. Across continental Europe, the single entered the top 40 on the charts of Belgium (Flanders and Wallonia), Italy, the Netherlands, and Sweden while peaking at number 84 in Germany. It also reached the top 40 in Australia, where it peaked at number 33 and spent four weeks inside the ARIA Singles Chart top 50. In New Zealand, "What You Got" charted for 15 weeks, rising to its peak of number seven on 3 November 2002.

Track listings
UK and Australian CD single
 "What You Got" – 3:56
 "Lost for Words" – 3:12
 "What You Got" (Almighty radio edit) – 3:49
 "What You Got" (video)

UK cassette single
 "What You Got" – 3:56
 "Lost for Words" – 3:12
 "What You Got" (Almighty radio edit) – 3:49

European CD single
 "What You Got" – 3:54
 "Lost for Words" – 3:02

Credits and personnel
Credits are lifted from the European CD single liner notes.

Studios
 Recorded, engineering, and programmed at Biffco Studios
 Mastered at Transfermation (London, England)

Personnel

 Abs – writing (as Richard Breen), vocals, instruments
 Richard "Biff" Stannard – writing, backing vocals, instruments, production
 Julian Gallagher – writing, instruments, production
 Errol Thompson – writing
 Althea Forrest – writing
 Joe Gibbs – writing
 Donna Reid – writing
 Dawn Joseph – backing vocals
 Shernette May – backing vocals

 Sharon Murphy – backing vocals
 Paul Gendler – guitar
 Neil Sidwell – trombone
 Dave Bishop – saxophone
 Paul Sprong – trumpet
 Alvin Sweeney – recording, engineering, programming
 Steve Robson – additional production, mixing
 Tom Elmhirst – mix engineering
 Richard Dowling – mastering

Charts

Weekly charts

Year-end charts

Release history

References

2002 songs
2002 debut singles
Abz Love songs
Bertelsmann Music Group singles
RCA Records singles
Song recordings produced by Richard Stannard (songwriter)
Song recordings produced by Steve Robson
Songs written by Abz Love
Songs written by Julian Gallagher
Songs written by Richard Stannard (songwriter)
Syco Music singles